Jean-Marie Despréaux or Louis Despréaux Saint-Sauveur, born on 20 December 1794 in Fougères and deceased on 27 November 1843 in Mexico City, was a French botanist.

Life
Jean-Marie Despréaux participated in several Napoleonic campaigns. After practicing for a few years as a doctor, he got involved in politics, belonged to the editorial staff of the National and was a member of the scientific mission in Morea in 1829, within the Section of Physical Sciences led by the naturalist Jean-Baptiste Bory de Saint-Vincent. In addition to his participation in the scientific exploration of Greece, he participated later to that in the Canary Islands.

He then settled as a doctor in Mexico City and created a company for the exploitation of the resin of the trees of Mayorazgo (it was a failure) and published articles in the magazine El Museo Mexicano.

Jean-Marie Despréaux was a specialist of cryptogams, and in particular of lichens, fungi and algae. The species Convolvulus × despreauxii, endemic to the Canary Islands and of which he collected the nomenclatural type specimen in April 1839 in the mountains near Santiago del Teide in the Canaries Islands, was named after him.

Note

References

External links 

Catalogue collectif de France, Bibliothèque Nationale de France (BnF): [Despréaux Saint-Sauveur, Louis], 1794-1843, botaniste français
Manuscrits de l'Institut de France, Considérations générales ; Tableau synoptique des espèces : pièces manuscrites. Nombreux dessins de végétaux joints à ces travaux. Shelf mark / reference : Ms 2442 / XIV / 378–402, Date : s.d., Techniques: dessin. Auteur: Despréaux Saint-Sauveur, Louis, 1794-1843, botaniste français.
Manuscrits, archives, collections d'œuvres d'art, d'objets patrimoniaux, de photographies anciennes et d'instruments scientifiques du Muséum national d'Histoire naturelle. Peintures et descriptions de champignons de Despréaux, Canaries. Shelf mark / reference : Ms Cry 419 / 1549–1558. Date : 1834–39. Subject: Canaries. Author: Despréaux Saint-Sauveur, Louis Jean-Marie (1794-1843)
Jean-Baptiste Bory de Saint-Vincent, Relation de l'Expédition scientifique de Morée: Section des sciences physiques, F.-G. Levrault, Paris, 1836
Joaquín García Icazbalceta. Necrologia - Don Juan María Despréaux. El Museo Mexicano. volume 2. pages 502–503.

1794 births
1843 deaths
Phycologists
French mycologists
French lichenologists
19th-century French botanists